Lynnette Marie O'Nan (née Cole; born February 9, 1978) is an American television personality, actress, and beauty pageant titleholder who won the title Miss Tennessee USA in 2000. She went on to become the first woman from that state to win the Miss USA pageant, which was held in Branson, Missouri on February 4, 2000.

Cole hails from Columbia, Tennessee and was twenty-one years old when she won the national crown.

Family background
Cole is of Puerto Rican heritage. At ten months old, she was living in foster care with her older brother when they were adopted by Gail and Larry Cole, who had to move interstate to circumvent a law prohibiting adoption of children from a different race. Her adoptive parents had previously been foster parents to a succession of over 100 children.

Pageants
Cole's first major pageant win came in 1995 when she won the title Miss Tennessee Teen USA. She was a top six finalist at the Miss Teen USA pageant in that year, and won the Miss Photogenic award, finishing fourth overall. Cole would later win the 1997 Miss Teen All American title.

After winning Miss Tennessee USA Cole competed for and won the title of Miss USA 2000, becoming the second Hispanic woman to win Miss USA after Laura Harring in 1985. Cole went on to compete at the Miss Universe pageant, held in Nicosia, Cyprus later that year. Her performance was enough to secure her a spot among the five finalists, and brought the U.S. back into the semifinals (after Kimberly Pressler had failed to advance the year before, breaking a streak of consecutive placements that had been going since 1977). She also placed fifth overall. She became the first woman to place in the top five at all three pageants and her record was not surpassed until 2006 by Tara Conner. This was the first time in the Miss Universe pageant history that two women of Puerto Rican heritage (Cole and Puerto Rico's Zoribel Fonalledas) participated at the same time representing different countries.

As Miss USA, Cole was a representative of the Miss Universe Organization. Her "sister" 2000 titleholders were Lara Dutta (Miss Universe, of India) and Jillian Parry (Miss Teen USA, of Pennsylvania).

After the Crown
Since winning Miss USA, Cole has become a television host for NBC, CMT, ESPN, MTV, VH-1 and made many appearances on As the World Turns. Along with her hosting career, she has appeared in numerous print advertising campaigns and commercials.

Cole also directs a local preliminary for Miss Tennessee USA.

References

1978 births
American people of Puerto Rican descent
Living people
Miss Tennessee USA winners
Miss Universe 2000 contestants
Miss USA 2000 delegates
Miss USA winners
People from Columbia, Tennessee
American adoptees
1995 beauty pageant contestants
20th-century Miss Teen USA delegates
20th-century American people